The 2011 Vodacom Cup was contested from 25 February to 13 May 2011. The tournament was the 14th edition of the Vodacom Cup, an annual domestic South African rugby union competition, and was played between the fourteen provincial teams in South Africa, as well as Namibian side  and Argentine side .

Competition rules and information

Sixteen teams participated in the 2011 Vodacom Cup competition. These teams were geographically divided into two sections, with eight teams in each of the Northern and Southern Sections. Teams played all the teams in the other section once over the course of the season, either at home or away.

Teams received four log points for a win and two points for a draw. Bonus log points were awarded to teams that scored four or more tries in a game, as well as to teams that lost a match by seven points or less. Teams were ranked by log points, then points difference (points scored less points conceded).

The top four teams in each section qualified for the title play-offs. In the quarter finals, the teams that finished first in each section had home advantage against the teams that finished fourth in that section and the teams that finished second in each section had home advantage against the teams that finished third in that section. The winners of these quarter finals then played each other in the semi-finals, with the higher-placed team having home advantage. The two semi-final winners then met in the final.

Teams

Changes from 2010

  was renamed .

Team Listing

The following teams took part in the 2011 Vodacom Cup competition:

Results

The following matches were played in the 2011 Vodacom Cup:

All times are South African (GMT+2).

Round one

Round two

Round three

Round four

Round Five

Round Six

Round Seven

Round Eight

Quarter-finals

Semi-finals

Final

Winners

Top scorers
The following sections contain only points and tries which have been scored in competitive games in the 2011 Vodacom Cup.

Top points scorers

Source: South African Rugby Union

Top try scorers

Source: South African Rugby Union

See also

Vodacom Cup
2011 Currie Cup Premier Division
2011 Currie Cup First Division

External links

References

Vodacom Cup
2011 in South African rugby union
2011 rugby union tournaments for clubs
Vodacom Cup, 2011
Vodacom Cup, 2011